The 2018–19 The Citadel Bulldogs basketball team represented The Citadel, The Military College of South Carolina in the 2018–19 NCAA Division I men's basketball season. The Bulldogs, led by fourth-year head coach Duggar Baucom, played their home games at McAlister Field House as members of the Southern Conference, as they have since 1936–37. The Bulldogs finished the season 12–18, 4–14 in SoCon play to finish in a three-way tie for eighth place. As the No. 10 seed in the SoCon tournament, they lost in the first round to Samford.

Previous season
The Bulldogs finished the 2017–18 season 11–21, 5–13 in SoCon play to finish in eighth place. They defeated VMI in the first round of the SoCon tournament before losing in the quarterfinals to UNC Greensboro.

Roster

Schedule and results

|-
! colspan=8 style=|Exhibition

|-
! colspan=8 style=|Regular season

|-
! colspan="9" style=| SoCon tournament

References

The Citadel Bulldogs basketball seasons
Citadel
Citadel Bulldogs bask
Citadel Bulldogs bask